Luís Miguel Fontes Martins (born 24 July 1972 in Santa Maria da Feira, Aveiro District), known as Luís Miguel, is a Portuguese retired footballer who played as a midfielder.

External links

1972 births
Living people
Sportspeople from Santa Maria da Feira
Portuguese footballers
Association football midfielders
C.F. União de Lamas players
Gil Vicente F.C. players
Rio Ave F.C. players
F.C. Felgueiras players
Primeira Liga players
Liga Portugal 2 players
Segunda Divisão players
Portugal youth international footballers
Portugal under-21 international footballers